The Makarrwanhalmirr (Mugarganalmiri) are an indigenous Australian clan-people of the Northern Territory. They are not registered as a separate tribe in Norman Tindale's classic 1974 survey.

Language
The Makarrwanhalmirr are a Dhuwala clan of the Yirritja moiety.

People
According to the website of the Australian Institute of Aboriginal and Torres Strait Islander Studies, the Makarrwanhalmirr are a clan of the Yirritja moiety of the Yolngu.

Notes

Citations

Sources

Aboriginal peoples of the Northern Territory